WWHS-FM was a Variety formatted broadcast radio station, which was licensed to and served Hampden Sydney, Virginia.  WWHS-FM was owned and operated by Hampden-Sydney College.

Programming
WWHS broadcast student created programming from its studios in Hampden Sydney. WWHS retransmitted programming from World Radio Network at times when the station wasn't airing local programming.

Sign-Off
WWHS-FM signed off and turned in its license on September 29, 2014.

References

External links
 

1972 establishments in Virginia
2014 disestablishments in Virginia
Variety radio stations in the United States
Radio stations established in 1972
Radio stations disestablished in 2014
WHS-FM
WHS-FM
Prince Edward County, Virginia
Defunct radio stations in the United States
WHS-FM